Los nuestros is a Spanish suspense action drama TV series, with characters portrayed by Hugo Silva, Blanca Suárez, Luis Fernández, Antonio Velázquez and Álvaro Cervantes. The first season was released in December 2015 by Mediaset España and the second one in the first trimester of 2017.

In Spain, the first season had an audience of 3,649,000 (19.6% share). In France, titled as Les otages du désert, was released on 26 August 2015 on M6 and had an audience of 1.46 million (6.7% share) for the first episode and 1.32 million (8.7%) for the second one.

The second season will be shot in Turkey, Madrid, Almería, the south of Sahara and Syria.

Cast

First season

Second season

References

External links
 
 

Telecinco network series
2015 Spanish television series endings
2010s Spanish drama television series
Spanish thriller television series
2015 Spanish television series debuts